Jabrani (also Romanized as Jabrānī; also known as Jabrā’ī-ye Bālā and Jabrānī-ye Bālā) is a village in Howmeh Rural District, in the Central District of Deyr County, Bushehr Province, Iran. At the 2006 census, its population was 183, in 46 families.

References 

Populated places in Deyr County